Shelley Puhak  is an American poet and writer. She was Eichner Professor of Creative Writing at Notre Dame of Maryland University. She won the Anthony Hecht Poetry Prize for her poetry collection Guinevere in Baltimore. She was a National Poetry Series winner for her poetry collection Harbinger She is also the author of The Dark Queens: The Bloody Rivalry That Forged the Medieval World, a double biography.

Life
Puhak was born in Washington, D.C. and graduated from University of Delaware with an MA, and from the University of New Orleans with an MFA.

Her work has appeared in Alaska Quarterly Review, Beloit Poetry Journal, Kenyon Review, Missouri Review, Southeast Review, and Superstition Review.

She is married; she and her husband live in Catonsville.

Works
The Dark Queens: The Bloody Rivalry That Forged the Medieval World, Bloomsbury Publishing, 2022, 
Guinevere in Baltimore,  WAYWISER Press, 2014,    
Stalin in Aruba,  Black Lawrence Press, 2010,

References

External links

Living people
People from Washington, D.C.
American women poets
Notre Dame of Maryland University
University of Delaware alumni
University of New Orleans alumni
People from Catonsville, Maryland
21st-century American poets
Year of birth missing (living people)
21st-century American women writers